Hoor may refer to:
Hoor, Iran, village in Iran
Höör, locality in Sweden
alternative spelling of Houri, women of paradise in Islamic societies